The 2010-11 Sacred Heart Pioneers season was their eighth season as a Division I Independent.

Regular season
On November 26 and 27, the Pioneers competed in the Nutmeg Classic hosted by the Connecticut Huskies women's ice hockeyprogram.  On January 8 and 9, the Pioneers competed in the Neumann Tournament in Aston, Pennsylvania. Other schools included Cortland and Neumann.

Schedule

Player stats

Awards and honors

References

 

Sacred Heart
Sacred Heart Pioneers women's ice hockey seasons
S
Sacred Heart Pioneers
Sacred Heart Pioneers